Watch Out is the debut album by saxophonist René McLean recorded in 1975 and released on the SteepleChase label.

Reception

AllMusic reviewer Scott Yanow stated "The son of Jackie McLean, Rene did not yet have a distinctive voice, but he showed much potential for the future. His sextet hints at the innovations of the avant-garde while remaining closer to the style of Art Blakey's Jazz Messengers. It's a worthwhile if not overly memorable effort".

Track listing
All compositions by René McLean except where noted.
 "Bilad as Sudan (Land of the Blacks)" – 7:02
 "Aida" – 5:30
 "What It Is" – 9:05
 "Watch Out" (Nathan Page) – 6:18
 "Jack's Tune" (Jackie McLean) – 5:53
 "Jihad" – 5:36
 "Uptown Downtown" (Hubert Eaves) – 5:46

Personnel
René McLean – alto saxophone, soprano saxophone, tenor saxophone, flute
Danny Coleman – trumpet, flugelhorn
Nathan Page – guitar
Hubert Eaves III – piano
Buster Williams – bass
Freddie Waits – drums

References

SteepleChase Records albums
1975 albums